Julie Baldassi is a Canadian film producer.  She is most noted as a producer of the 2021 film Wildhood, which was a Canadian Screen Award nominee for Best Picture at the 10th Canadian Screen Awards in 2021.

The president of Younger Daughter Films, her other credits have included the short films My Dead Dad's Porno Tapes and I Am in the World as Free and Slender as a Deer on a Plain, the feature film Tenzin, and the music video for Jeremy Dutcher's song "Mehcinut".

References

External links

Film producers from Ontario
Canadian women film producers
Living people
Year of birth missing (living people)
Canadian film production company founders